The 1977–78 season was the 79th season for FC Barcelona.

La Liga

League table

Results

External links

webdelcule.com

FC Barcelona seasons
Barcelona